Rohan Prem (born 13 September 1986) is an Indian cricketer who plays domestic cricket for Kerala in domestic cricket. He is a left-handed middle order batsman and off-spin bowler.

Early and personal life

Rohan hails from Kannammoola in Thiruvananthapuram district of Kerala. His father T. Prembhastin was an employee at a private firm in Thiruvananthapuram and his mother is Jacqueline. His first coach was Sreekumar, a trainer at the Sports Council. He is married to Anju.

Domestic career

He made his first-class debut against Rajasthan at Jaipur in 2005. He scored three centuries during the 2008–09 season of the Ranji Trophy Plate League. He was the captain of the Kerala cricket team the 2016–17 Ranji Trophy. He is the first Kerala cricketer to score 4000 Runs in First class cricket.

In August 2018, he was one of five players that were suspended for three games in the 2018–19 Vijay Hazare Trophy, after showing dissent against Kerala's captain, Sachin Baby.

References

External links

1986 births
Living people
Indian cricketers
Kerala cricketers
South Zone cricketers
Cricketers from Thiruvananthapuram
Kala Bagan Krira Chakra cricketers
India Green cricketers